Radicofani is a comune in the Province of Siena in the Italian region Tuscany, located in the natural park of Val d'Orcia about  southeast of Florence and about  southeast of Siena.

Radicofani borders the following municipalities: Abbadia San Salvatore, Castiglione d'Orcia, Pienza, San Casciano dei Bagni, Sarteano.

Main sights
The main landmark of Radicofani is its Rocca (Castle), of Carolingian origin, documented since 978 as the Castle of Ghino di Tacco. It has two lines of walls: the external one has a pentagonal shape, while the inner one is triangular, with three ruined towers at each corner and a cassero (donjon) which can be visited.

Also notable is the Romanesque church of San Pietro, with a nave housing works by Andrea della Robbia, Benedetto Buglioni and Santi Buglioni. Also by della Robbia is the precious Madonna with Saints at the high altar of the church of Sant'Agata.

Climate
Climate is characterized by relatively high temperatures and evenly distributed precipitation throughout the year.  The Köppen Climate Classification subtype for this climate is Cfa (Humid Subtropical Climate).

References

External links
 Official website
Rocca di Radicofani 

Cities and towns in Tuscany
Castles in Italy
Val d'Orcia